West Nyack is a hamlet and census-designated place in the town of Clarkstown, Rockland County, New York, United States. It is located north of Blauvelt, east of Nanuet, southwest of Valley Cottage, southeast of Bardonia, and west of Central Nyack. The population was 3,439 at the 2010 census.

History

The hamlet was originally known as Clarksville and subsequently MontMoor. It was subsequently merged with the small village located adjacent to the West Shore Railroad station where the Nyack Water Works were also located and became known as West Nyack in 1891.

The original families' names live on in other locations of the current town: DeClarkes, Demarests, Lydeckers Oblenis, Tallmans and  Vanderbilts.

Geography
West Nyack is located at  (41.091096, -73.968785).

Demographics

As of the census of 2000, there were 3,282 people, 1,107 households, and 892 families residing in the CDP. The population density was 1,125.9 per square mile (435.5/km2). There were 1,132 housing units at an average density of 388.3/sq mi (150.2/km2). The racial makeup of the CDP was 88.03% White, 1.98% African American, 0.03% Native American, 7.59% Asian, 0.98% from other races, and 1.40% from two or more races. Hispanic or Latino of any race were 5.58% of the population.

There were 1,107 households, out of which 36.7% had children under the age of 18 living with them, 70.8% were married couples living together, 6.9% had a female householder with no husband present, and 19.4% were non-families. 14.2% of all households were made up of individuals, and 6.1% had someone living alone who was 65 years of age or older. The average household size was 2.95 and the average family size was 3.27.

In the CDP, the population was spread out, with 23.8% under the age of 18, 5.7% from 18 to 24, 29.2% from 25 to 44, 27.5% from 45 to 64, and 13.8% who were 65 years of age or older. The median age was 40 years. For every 100 females, there were 93.9 males. For every 100 females age 18 and over, there were 91.9 males.

The median income for a household in the CDP was $98,931, and the median income for a family was $106,576. Males had a median income of $67,326 versus $41,518 for females. The per capita income for the CDP was $40,178. About 1.0% of families and 2.6% of the population were below the poverty line, including 1.3% of those under age 18 and 5.2% of those age 65 or over.

Education

 Strawtown Elementary School became a Blue Ribbon Award winner in 2007. This is the second school in Rockland County to win this award.
 West Nyack Elementary School is located in West Nyack.
 Clarkstown High School South is located in West Nyack.
 Felix Festa Middle School is also located in West Nyack.

Transportation
West Nyack is located along the New York State Thruway, at the Exit 12 interchange. Other major thoroughfares in West Nyack are New York State Route 303 and New York State Route 59. The Palisades Interstate Parkway is located at the western edge of the hamlet.

West Nyack is located along CSX Transportation's River Line, with 20 to 55 freight trains passing through the hamlet daily. Passenger service ended on the line in 1959.

Landmarks and places of interest

 Palisades Center, one of the largest malls in the country, is located along Route 59, Route 303 and the New York State Thruway (I-87 and I-287), exit 12.
 Clarkstown Reformed Church – 107 Strawtown Road – Site of the First Reformed Protestant Dutch Church of New Hempstead (name in reference to many who moved here from Hempstead. L.I.). Built 1750–51, replaced 1871 by present Clarkstown Reformed Church, 107 Strawtown Road. Note gravestones inscribed in Dutch and those bearing names of 40 veterans of Revolutionary War and War of 1812 and of the Hill family, which produced three generations of artists and a renowned scientist.
 DeClark-Polhemus Mill – Remnants still exist on the southwest corner of Strawtown and Germonds roads, West Nyack. The last witchcraft trial in New York State supposedly took place at this gristmill in 1816. Jane (Naut) Kannif, a widow of a Scottish physician, was knowledgeable about herb medicines and was accused of practicing witchcraft. At the mill, Naut was weighed against a large brass-bound Dutch Bible on the large flour balance. Jane outweighed the Bible, was judged innocent and set free. The mill operated into the 20th century to grind flour. The hub of the water wheel still exists as does the dam and mill pond. Historical Marker on site.
 Mount Moor Cemetery – Mount Moor Cemetery sits in the shadow of the Palisades Center Mall, just north of Route 59. This well-kept cemetery is maintained by the Mount Moor Cemetery Association of 1 Milford Lane, Suffern. Although several stones appear to have been professionally restored, many are too badly worn to read. There are also many field stones often used as burial markers with no inscriptions as well as a plain wooden cross. One of the graves at Mount Moor is that of Lafayette Logan, a Buffalo Soldier who fought in the American Civil War with the legendary black 54th Massachusetts Volunteer Infantry, the unit made famous in the motion picture Glory  About six others members of the Buffalo Soldiers are buried here. (NRHP)
Rockland Center for the Arts – Founded by Maxwell Anderson and others in 1947. Programs include a School for the Arts, exhibitions, a performing arts series and a Summer Arts Day Camp. The Center provides opportunities for artists to exhibit, perform, create and teach.
 Terneur-Hutton House – 160 Sickelton Road, National Register of Historic Places. (NRHP)

Historical markers
 Clarksville – West Nyack and Sickletown Rds.
 Clarksville Inn – 1 Strawtown Road. The inn was built by  Thomas Warner in 1840 as a hotel, and the buildings were restored in 1957. As of 2020, the Inn operated as a restaurant.  
 Colonial Clarkstown – 135 Strawtown Road
 Old Clarkstown Reformed Church Cemetery – 254 Germonds Road, where services have been held since 1740 in the adjacent Pye's Corner.
 Site of First Reformed Protestant Dutch Church of New Hempstead – 254 Germonds Road
Nyack Turnpike – West Nyack Road and West Nyack Way
The Old Parsonage – 106 Strawtown Road
 Van Houten Fields – In 1937 Ralph Borsodi organized a group for the purchase of a 106-acre Dutch farm divided into leased acreage plots, becoming the largest self-administered, back-to-the-land community in Rockland County.
 Washington's Encampment – 134 Strawtown Road, part of the original DeClark Farm fromo which  Clarkstown gets its name
 West Nyack's Last Horse Trough, West Nyack Free Library] – 65 Strawtown Road

Solar field
Clarkstown built New York's first solar field atop a capped landfill in 2014. It was slated to generate 3 million kilowatt-hours – enough power to supply about 200 homes, one-third of the electric needs of the Town of Clarkstown government and there are ongoing discussions about expanding it.

Notable people

 Adam Chanler-Berat, actor (Peter and the Starcatcher, Next to Normal)
 Jake T. Austin, actor (Wizards of Waverly Place)
 John Flaherty (born 1967), retired Major League Baseball player and current YES Network broadcaster
 John William Hill (1812–1879), British-born American artist. He was the son of John Hill who resided in West Nyack and was known as "Master of the Aquatint".
 George William Hill (1838–1914), mathematician and astronomer, student of lunar motion
 Morris Kantor (1896–1974), Russian-born American painter
 Charles Wright Mills (1916, Waco, Texas – 1962, West Nyack, New York), sociologist
 Michael Park (born 1968), Emmy Award-winning actor
 Arthur S. Tompkins (1865-1938), U.S. Representative from New York and a justice of the New York Supreme Court

Timothy Yang (born 2007) Broadway child ator 2015 Tony Awards Best Revival of a Musical King and I
 Jason Vosler (born 1993), baseball third baseman for the San Francisco Giants

References

Census-designated places in New York (state)
Hamlets in New York (state)
Census-designated places in Rockland County, New York
Hamlets in Rockland County, New York